This article contains an overview of the sport of athletics, including track and field, cross country and road running, in the year 2000.

The primary athletics competition for the 2000 season was at the 2000 Summer Olympics in Sydney, Australia.

Major events

World

Olympic Games
Summer Paralympics
World Cross Country Championships
World Half Marathon Championships
Grand Prix Final
IAAF Golden League
World Junior Championships

Regional

African Championships
Asian Championships
Balkan Games
Commonwealth Youth Games
South American Cross Country Championships
European Indoor Championships
European Cross Country Championships
European Cup
European Race Walking Cup
Ibero-American Championships

National
2000 Lithuanian Athletics Championships

World records

Men

   None this year

Women

Awards

Men

Women

Men's Best Year Performances

Marathon

400m Hurdles

3,000m Steeplechase

Pole Vault

Hammer Throw

Decathlon

Women's Best Year Performances

100 metres

200 metres

Half Marathon

Marathon

100m Hurdles

400m Hurdles

3,000m Steeplechase

High Jump

Pole Vault

Hammer Throw

Heptathlon

Deaths
March 7 — Masami Yoshida (41), Japanese javelin thrower (b. 1958)
August 7 — Mona-Lisa Pursiainen (49), Finnish sprinter (b. 1951)

References
 ARRS

 
Athletics (track and field) by year